The 2023 ASUN women's basketball tournament was the conference postseason tournament for the ASUN Conference. The tournament was the 44th year the league has conducted a postseason tournament. The tournament was held March 4, 5, 8, and 11 at campus sites of the higher seeds. The winner will receive the conference's automatic bid to the 2023 NCAA Tournament.

Seeds 
Ten teams will contest the bracket. The tournament has a new format in 2023, as all rounds reseed instead of a traditional set braacket. To that end, the 9 and 10 seeds play each other in round 1, and the 7 and 8 seed do as well, rather than the traditional 7/10 and 8/9 matchup.

The two tiebreakers used by the ASUN are: 1) head-to-head record of teams with identical record and 2) NCAA NET Rankings available on day following the conclusion of ASUN regular season play.

Schedule

Bracket

References 

Tournament
ASUN women's basketball tournament
ASUN men's basketball tournament